This is a list of seasons completed by Cincinnati Cyclones in the teams' history across multiple leagues in the East Coast Hockey League (1990–92), original International Hockey League (1992–2001), and the return to the ECHL (2002–2004, 2006–present).

Note: GP = Games played, W = Wins, L = Losses, T = Ties, OTL = Overtime losses, SOL = Shootout losses, Pts = Points, PCT = Winning percentage, GF = Goals for, GA = Goals against, PIM = Penalty infraction minutes

Records as of conclusion of 2020–21 season.

References

Cincinnati Cyclones